The 2020–21 season was Irish provincial rugby union side Connacht Rugby's twentieth season competing in the Pro14, and the team's twenty-fifth season as a professional side. It was Andy Friend's third season in charge of the side.

In addition to the Pro14, Connacht competed in the European Champions Cup. This was confirmed in August 2020, as the tournament was expanded to 24 teams on a one-season basis. The Champions Cup pool stage finished prematurely after just two rounds. As one of the bottom eight teams at that point, Connacht were entered into the Challenge Cup in the round of 16 where they were beaten by the Leicester Tigers.

Coaching and management team
Note: Flags indicate national union as has been defined under WR eligibility rules. Individuals may hold more than one non-WR nationality.

Players

Senior playing squad

Academy squad

Senior team transfers

Unlike most seasons, where the bulk of transfers occur during the summer pre-season the 2019–20 season saw two separate periods of major transfer activity. Many moves scheduled to happen at the end of the season instead took place during the extended hiatus from March to August 2020. Despite these moves technically happening during the previous season, they are included in the transfers listed here.

Players in
PR  Jack Aungier from  Leinster
PR  Jordan Duggan promoted from Academy
LK  Cormac Daly from  Clontarf
LK  Óisín Dowling from  Leinster
LK  Niall Murray promoted from Academy
BR  Seán Masterson promoted from Academy
BR  Conor Oliver from  Munster
BR  Abraham Papali'i from  Bay of Plenty
SH  Colm Reilly promoted from Academy
FH  Conor Dean promoted from Academy
CE  Sammy Arnold from  Munster
WG  Ben O'Donnell from  Australia Sevens
WG  Peter Sullivan promoted from Academy
WG  Alex Wootton from  Munster (season-long loan)

Players out
HK  Tom McCartney retired
PR  Rory Burke released
PR  Peter McCabe to  Bristol Bears
LK  Joe Maksymiw to  Dragons
BR  Robin Copeland to  Soyaux Angoulême
BR  Colby Fainga'a to  Lyon
BR  Eoin McKeon released
SH  Angus Lloyd retiring
FH  David Horwitz to  Randwick
CE  Kyle Godwin to  Western Force
WG  Niyi Adeolokun to  Bristol Bears
FB  Darragh Leader released

 Player's name in italics indicates a transfer that took place after the start of the season

Results

Pro14

Regular season

Rainbow Cup

League stage

Champions Cup

Pool B

Challenge Cup

Round of 16

Notes

References

Connacht Rugby seasons
2020–21 Pro14 by team